Yinka Ayenuwa (born 2 May 1986 in Warri) is a Nigerian weightlifter. He competed in the men's 69 kg event at the 2014 Commonwealth Games where he won a silver medal. In 2015, he won 3 silver medals at the African Games.

Major results

References

External links
 
 
 

1986 births
Living people
Nigerian male weightlifters
Commonwealth Games silver medallists for Nigeria
Weightlifters at the 2014 Commonwealth Games
Yoruba sportspeople
Commonwealth Games medallists in weightlifting
African Games silver medalists for Nigeria
African Games medalists in weightlifting
Competitors at the 2007 All-Africa Games
Competitors at the 2015 African Games
Sportspeople from Warri
20th-century Nigerian people
21st-century Nigerian people
Medallists at the 2014 Commonwealth Games